A polar bear, After Eight or Peppermint Paddy (a play on Peppermint Patty) is a mint chocolate cocktail that tastes like a York Peppermint Pattie or an After Eight mint. It is usually made from crème de cacao and peppermint schnapps, although crème de menthe is a popular substitute.

Preparation
A polar bear is usually served cold in a shot glass. The typical ingredients are:
 1 oz. (28ml) creme de cacao liqueur
 1 oz. (28ml) peppermint schnapps liqueur

One popular recipe involves shaking all ingredients with crushed ice and serving in a shot glass with a mint leaf as garnish. The drink can also be served in a shot glass without ice, or "on the rocks" in a rocks glass.

Variations
 Polar bear #2, made with 3 oz. vodka, 1 oz. Blue Curaçao, and 7-up soda
 Polar bear #3, an alternate version made with 3 oz. vodka, 1 oz. lime juice, and 7-Up
 Polar bear #4, Polar Bear using creme de cacao and creme de menthe. This can either be layered or made in a cocktail shaker
 Polar bear cooler,  using 2 oz. dark rum, 1 oz. red vermouth, 1 oz. lime juice, 1/2 orange juice, and 3 oz. 7-Up. Pour into a Collins glass filled with broken ice and add a spiral of lemon. Garnish with an orange wedge and cherry. Serve with straws.
 Polar bear in a blizzard, made with 1 oz. white chocolate cream liqueur, 1 oz. peppermint schnapps liqueur, and 1 oz. vodka.
 Polar bear drink, made with 1 shot vodka, 1 shot Blue Curaçao, and Sprite to fill.
  Alaskan polar bear heater, made with 2 shots vodka, 1/2 shot rum, 1 handful bitters, a smidgen of vinegar, 1 shot vermouth, 1 shot gin, 1 shot of brandy, lemon peel, orange peel, 1 cherry, and 1 shot scotch (as seen in the film The Nutty Professor)
 Vodka and Champagne cocktails with similar names:
 Czechoslovak polar bear /  lední medvěd –  a shot of vodka in a glass of Champagne
 V2 (German pronunciation: "Fau tsvay") – two shots of vodka in champagne
 Soyuz 3 – three shots of vodka in champagne

See also
 List of cocktails

References

Cocktails with liqueur
Shooters (drinks)
Cocktails with chocolate liqueur